Margaret of Città di Castello (1287 – 12 April 1320) was an Italian Roman Catholic and professed member of the Third Order of Saint Dominic. Margaret had disabilities and became known for her deep faith and holiness. Her parents abandoned her in a local church due to her disabilities and the town's poor took her in and assumed care for her. Nuns later offered her a home at their convent but soon came to detest her presence and cast her out, prompting the town's poor to once again take her in and care for her. But she met with Dominican friars and was accepted as a secular member in their third order; she started a school for children to teach them in the faith and often took care of children while their parents were out at work.

Margaret's holiness was apparent to all in her life that people lobbied for her to be buried in the local church which was an honor reserved for few - this was a clear demonstration people believed in her holiness. Her beatification received approval from Pope Paul V on 19 October 1609. Pope Francis later declared her a saint through equipollent canonization on 24 April 2021.

Life
Margaret della Metola was born in Perugia in 1287 to the nobles Parisio and Emilia in the Metola Castle near Mercatello sul Metauro. Her father served at the garrison at the castle.

Metola was born blind with a severe curvature of the spine and had difficulties in walking; she was also a dwarf. Though her parents were embarrassed and hid her from all, a kind maid found her and gave her the name Margaret (derived from the Greek word "margaron", meaning "pearl"). When she was almost publicly discovered at age six, her parents walled her for about a decade in a room attached to their residence's chapel, to ensure no one would see her, although she could attend Mass and receive the sacraments. Her parents’ chaplain instructed her in the faith. 

But soon there was an imminent threat of invasion at the castle, so Parisio ordered his wife to place a dark veil upon their daughter so the two could flee to his other castle at Mercatello. There she was again imprisoned in a vault-like cubicle containing nothing more than an old small bench. There were some who knew of Margaret and were furious at her treatment, though they never dared broach the subject with the sometimes temper-prone Parisio. Her mother soon suggested taking her to a church where miracles were said to occur. Emilia was timid asking her husband but was surprised to see that he showed a keen interest.

In 1303 her parents took her one morning to a shrine in the Franciscan church in Castello - where miracles were said to have happened, in hope of a cure for Metola's birth defects. When no such miracle happened, her parents abandoned her there. But she never came to resent or be bitter over her parents' decision. Some women at the church noticed her there. The town's poor took her in as one of their own and she was passed to several poor families who helped prisoners and other poor people. Metola was soon granted safe haven in a local convent. Their lax manner of life, though, soon conflicted with her intense faith and she was expelled from the convent since her fervor was a tacit reproach to the nuns who came to detest her presence. It was after this that she took up residence in the town where the townsfolk resumed caring for her. To thank them for their kindness, she opened a small school for the children of the town where she instructed them in the faith and the psalms, which she had learnt during her time with the nuns. Metola also looked after the town's children when their parents went to work.

In 1303 she came to know the friars from the Dominicans who had become established in the town not long before. Margaret came under their spiritual guidance and was admitted to the local chapter of the Third Order of Saint Dominic; she received the religious habit of the order.

Metola died on 12 April 1320 and the crowds at her funeral demanded that she be buried inside the church against the resistance of the parish priest. But after a disabled girl was cured at the funeral he allowed for Metola's burial inside.

Sainthood
Her remains were transferred on 9 June 1558 because her coffin was rotten. Her clothes were also rotten but her remains were preserved. The local bishop ordered for a new casket to be made to house her remains, though he decided to inspect her remains for the beatification cause which had been started. Metola measured four feet long and her head was rather large in proportion to her thin figure. Her forehead was broad with a face tapering to the chin with a quite prominent nose. Her teeth were small and even and were serrated at the edges. Her hands and feet were small with her right leg an inch and a half shorter than the left (the cause for her limp).

Her "cultus" (or longstanding veneration) was recognized allowing Pope Paul V to confer equivalent beatification for her on 19 October 1609. Pope Clement X extended the privilege of a Mass and Divine Office in her name to the entire Dominican order on 6 April 1675 rather than for the Perugian branch as Paul V had done at her beatification. In 1988 the Urbino archbishop, Ugo Donato Bianchi, named her as a patron for the blind.

Pope Francis declared her a saint through equipollent canonization on 24 April 2021.

Dedications
There are two Dominican parishes in the United States that have shrines to Saint Margaret of Castello: St. Louis Bertrand Church in Louisville, Kentucky, and St. Patrick Church in Columbus, Ohio.

References

External links

 
 Saints SQPN

1287 births
1320 deaths
13th-century venerated Christians
14th-century Italian Roman Catholic religious sisters and nuns
14th-century venerated Christians
Italian blind people
Blind royalty and nobility
Canonizations by Pope Francis
Dominican beatified people
Dominican tertiaries
Lay Dominicans
Incorrupt saints
Italian beatified people
People from Città di Castello
People with dwarfism
Venerated Dominicans